Profire Energy is an oilfield technology company, specializing in the design of burner-management systems (BMS) and other combustion-management technologies. They serve the upstream and midstream portions of the oil/gas industry, providing systems that monitor and manage the burners used in the industry's combustion vessels (e.g. tanks, dehydrators, separators,  etc.). In 2012, they were recognized as one of the fastest-growing companies in the world by International Business Times, and then recognized in 2013 as one of the fastest-growing companies in North America by Deloitte. They have offices in Lindon, Utah; Edmonton, Alberta; Oklahoma City, Oklahoma; Houston, Texas; Victoria, Texas; and Tioga, Pennsylvania.

History 
Profire Energy was established in Alberta, Canada in March 2002 as a private company ("Profire Combustion"). Brenton W. Hatch (now CEO), Harold E. Albert (now COO) co-founded the company to service oil/gas producers, but soon created a control panel for the management of burners, a system called the Profire 1100. After a few years of continued development, the company made the decision to go public (in 2008) under the name Profire Energy, Inc. (OTCBB: PFIE). They have since developed additional (and more advanced) products, opened multiple offices throughout the US, and continued development of their product line for domestic and international use.

Markets 
Profire Energy predominately serves the North American upstream and midstream oil/gas industry, but announced a Brazilian distribution channel in early 2012, as well as an Australian distribution channel in early 2014.

References

External links 

Companies based in Alberta
Companies listed on the Nasdaq
Oil companies of Canada
Oilfield services companies